Te Atatū South is a residential suburb in West Auckland, New Zealand. Its location allows the suburb easy access to the city and Henderson town centre. Its elevation allows views back on to the city and Waitākere Ranges. Situated on the Te Atatū Peninsula, it has coasts backing on to water on its eastern and western sides with walkways and cycleways on both sides.

Geography and geological history 

Te Atatū South is formed from Waitemata Sandstone, which formed on the ocean floor 20 million years ago, overlayed with alluvial soil from ancient waterways. Te Atatū is bound on the west by the Te Wai-o-Pareira / Henderson Creek and to the east by the Whau River, both of which are drowned valleys. The northern border of the suburb is the Northwestern Motorway, which separates Te Atatū South from the Te Atatū Peninsula (formerly known as Te Atatū North).

Te Atatū South is located in the Tāmaki Ecological District. The majority of the area is a part of the Warm Lowlands Ecosystem, which was originally dominated by a forest of kauri, rimu, rātā, kahikatea and rewarewa trees. The south-east of the suburb borderin the Whau River]] has a Harbour Coastline Ecosystem, which was originally a diverse lowland forest, including trees such as pōhutukawa, pūriri, nīkau palms, mamangi and kōwhai.

History

The area prior to suburban settlement was used largely for vineyards, poultry farms, fruit trees, apples, lemons orchards and flower farms. Vineyards were located along Te Atatu, McLeod and Edmonton Rd's. There were brickworks under what is now the Whau River bridge and a timber mill at the end of Roberts Rd.

The name "Te Atatu South" was attributed to the area in 1961 when the area of Te Atatū was divided by the Northwestern Motorway (State Highway 16). With the new motorway, the area rapidly changed in 10 years from rural to suburban. While new homes in Te Atatū Peninsula were dominated by one builder, "Neil Homes", Te Atatū South had more diversity in new homes and a large quantity of larger quality family homes. These homes reflected Te Atatū South being one of the more affluent areas in West Auckland during the 1970s and 1980s.

Today the suburb is redeveloping its roads and town centre to accommodate more modern needs to build a more walkable and vibrant community.

Demographics

Te Atatū South had a population of 15,138 at the 2018 New Zealand census, an increase of 1,341 people (9.7%) since the 2013 census, and an increase of 2,679 people (21.5%) since the 2006 census. There were 4,794 households, comprising 7,446 males and 7,692 females, giving a sex ratio of 0.97 males per female, with 3,156 people (20.8%) aged under 15 years, 3,315 (21.9%) aged 15 to 29, 7,020 (46.4%) aged 30 to 64, and 1,647 (10.9%) aged 65 or older.

Ethnicities were 52.2% European/Pākehā, 15.6% Māori, 17.6% Pacific peoples, 29.3% Asian, and 3.7% other ethnicities. People may identify with more than one ethnicity.

The percentage of people born overseas was 37.8, compared with 27.1% nationally.

Although some people chose not to answer the census's question about religious affiliation, 44.1% had no religion, 37.5% were Christian, 0.8% had Māori religious beliefs, 4.6% were Hindu, 2.5% were Muslim, 2.2% were Buddhist and 2.1% had other religions.

Of those at least 15 years old, 2,880 (24.0%) people had a bachelor's or higher degree, and 1,995 (16.6%) people had no formal qualifications. 1,914 people (16.0%) earned over $70,000 compared to 17.2% nationally. The employment status of those at least 15 was that 6,252 (52.2%) people were employed full-time, 1,575 (13.1%) were part-time, and 549 (4.6%) were unemployed.

Schools

Rangeview Intermediate School is for years 7–8, and has a roll of  students. It opened in 1968.

Tirimoana School was opened in 1969. Freyberg Community School is named after Bernard Freyberg, a Victoria Cross recipient and Governor-General of New Zealand.

Arohanui School caters for students aged 5 to 21 years with learning disability. It has a roll of  students. The school includes students who also attend other local schools.

The local state secondary school that services the area is Rutherford College which is just north of the boundary between the suburb and Te Atatū Peninsula.

All schools are coeducational. Rolls are as of

Parks and Reserves

Te Atatū South has many walkways, parks, reserves, esplanades and sporting facilities. Both coasts have walkways with the Twin Streams Pathway on the western side and Te Whau Pathway on the eastern side. Notable parks in the area include Te Atatū South Park which has sports fields, walking track, fitness equipment and playground. McLeod Park has sports fields, playground and walking track. Also, nearby is Tui Glen Reserve with its renowned Tree Top playground and picnic facilities. Trusts stadium is also nearby with running track, gym and sports facilities. The Te Atatū Boat club has boat and kayak launching facilities.

Sport

Te Atatū South is home to Waitemata AFC, West City Baseball Club (NZ's longest running baseball club) and fields for Waitakere Rugby club. The Te Atatu Boating Club was founded in 1959.

Main centres
Its main centre is the Te Atatū Town Centre where Edmonton Road and Te Atatu Road intersect. The Te Atatū South Community Centre is located here.

A small light industrial area is located on McLeod Road.

Transport
Te Atatu Road: the main road that runs through the whole suburb. Bus services run along here and Edmonton Road.

Edmonton Road: links to Henderson with close proximity to the Henderson Railway Station.

McLeod Road: a main road linking the southern part of the suburb to Henderson.

State Highway 16 (SH 16) / Northwestern Cycleway: the northern tip of the suburb links to the city and to the north. The Te Atatū State Highway interchange will be one of the stations on the proposed Western Route of the Light rail in Auckland network.

Twin Stream Walkway/Cycleway: on the western side of the suburb and running along  Te Wai-o-Pareira / Henderson Creek from the NorthWestern cycleway to Henderson's Twin streams and on to Oratia or Henderson Valley.

Te Whau Pathway (in progress): a walkway/cycleway on the eastern side of the suburb running along the historic Whau River. When completed it will link Te Atatū to Green Bay creating a pathway between the Manukau and Waitemata Harbour's.

Ferry Service (proposed). A ferry service has been proposed to link the suburb to the centre city.

Notable buildings and landmarks

36 Te Atatu Rd – Two Storey  home built in the 1930s for the wealthy Ryan family. It has been home to the Henderson Tennis Club and in 1955 it was bought by the Auckland Hospital Board and became a maternity hospital. It has been used recently for other commercial purposes.

Coop's Store - 104 McLeod Road. Built in the 1920s this store was the only store that serviced the area at the time and since then has continuously been operating a retail function in the suburb. It is situated on the corner of McLeod Road and Te Atatu Road. It has been a number of uses and currently is a café and food establishment.

111 McLeod Rd (Women's Centre). Built in 1924.  Was the residence of aviator Bob Johnson. The front door is adorned with a stained glass plane. He is responsible for a number of photographs of the area in the 1930s.

Ayr House - 17 Ayrton Street. Two storey home built out of kauri by the Roberts Family in the 1910s. The surrounding area was where the family had a timber factory and planted a lemon tree farm.

Swan Arch - Swan Arch Reserve, Central Park Drive. On the border of Te Atatū South and Henderson. Built by Henry Swan between 1901 and 1931. Henry Swan's story has been romanticised over the years. The Devonport solicitor told friends he was going to sail around the world in his yacht, Awatea but ended up living the life of a recluse on this part of the Henderson Creek for the next 30 years. In his time there he built the brick arch and kept an orchard.

Te Atatū South Community Centre – 247 Edmonton Road. The original centre opened in 1968.

Notable past and present residents

Brooke Family - Rugby family including All Black's Zinzan Brooke and Robin Brooke
Sir Graeme Douglas - Founder of Douglas Pharmaceuticals
Marina Erakovic – Tennis player
Shayne Elliott - ANZ Group Chief Executive
Michael Erceg - Founder of Independent Liquor
Jan Hellriegel - Singer/songwriter
Sir Michael Jones - All Black
Kees Meeuws - All Black
Paula Morris - Writer
John Rowles – OBE. Singer
Pio Terei - Actor, singer, comedian and TV presenter
Paul Urlovic – Ex All White
Ivan Vicelich – Most capped All White

References

External links
 Photographs of Te Atatu South held in Auckland Libraries' heritage collections.

Suburbs of Auckland
Henderson-Massey Local Board Area
Populated places around the Waitematā Harbour
West Auckland, New Zealand